Cima (Spanish for "Summit") is a small unincorporated community in the Mojave Desert of San Bernardino County, California, in the United States. The Ivanpah Mountains and Interstate 15 are to the north, the New York Mountains are to the east, and the Providence Mountains are to the south. Cima is also home to one of the densest Yucca brevifolia forests in California, located in the Cima Dome.

History
Herbert Graham Gibson established the first store at Cima in 1900. In 1905 the first post office opened in the store. Gibson refused to pump the gas for his customers and therefore may have created the first self-service station in the country. The site served as both a railroad siding and a commercial center for ranchers and miners.

Few people now live in the area. In fact, like the neighboring town of Kelso to the southwest, Cima is now usually considered a ghost town. Nevertheless, both towns still see considerable activity on the Union Pacific rail line that brought the towns into being. Between Kelso and Cima lies the Cima Grade, the steepest part of the line between the Los Angeles area and Las Vegas. Both sites also lie within the Mojave National Preserve, with the attendant tourist activity.

Climate

Cima does have a post office, with the ZIP code 92323 and the area code 760. The 92323 ZIP Code Tabulation Area had a population of 21 at the 2000 census.

References

 
 National Park Service - 

Mojave National Preserve
Ivanpah Valley
Unincorporated communities in San Bernardino County, California
Populated places in the Mojave Desert
Ghost towns in California
Unincorporated communities in California